The Indian Youth Congress is the youth wing of the Indian National Congress party. The Indian Youth Congress was a department of the Indian National Congress from the period just after the Partition of India in 1947 until the late 1960s.  While prime minister, Indira Gandhi gave the Youth Congress a new dimension by establishing it as a frontal organisation of the Congress Party, with the objective of doing social work and arguing against right-wing parties. Priya Ranjan Dasmunsi was the first elected president of the Indian Youth Congress;   

he later became Minister of Information and Broadcasting and Parliamentary affairs in the Indian cabinet. Narayan Dutt Tiwari was the first President. Jitin Prasada was also the president of the Indian youth congress. 

During the 1970s, under the leadership of Sanjay Gandhi, the Youth Congress undertook activities such as tree plantation, family planning, and fought against domestic violence and dowry deaths.  After the death of Sanjay Gandhi, Rajiv Gandhi took over in charge of the Youth Congress. After he became prime minister in 1984, Rajiv Gandhi reduced the voting age to 18. Rahul Gandhi was appointed a general secretary of the All India Congress Committee on 24 September 2007 and was given charge of the Indian Youth Congress along with the National Students Union of India.

The Indian Youth Congress has its headquarters in New Delhi and is headed by Srinivas BV.  There are 39 office bearers at the national level, followed by the state, Loksabha, Assembly and Booth level. In all, 174,000 committees have been formed at the Booth level.

Role in India

UTI Scam rally protest
In 2001, several Youth Congress workers held Lalkar Rally around Parliament of India to protest against UTI Scam under National Democratic Alliance government and asked for resignation of then Prime Minister Atal Bihari Vajpayee.

Protest against violent attacks
In 2011, 2,500 Youth Congress activists rallied and protested in Calcutta against the violent attacks on its supporters by the All India Trinamool Congress party.

Tripura civil disobedience movement
In 2012, Tripura Pradesh Youth Congress organized civil disobedience movement in all 23 sub-divisions in Tripura as part of agitation to protest against the Left Front government's failure to provide employment, nepotism, rise of crime and atrocities against women in the state. This saw procession of 4,000 Congress workers and detainment about 25,000 Youth Congress activists across the state.

Madhya Pradesh memorandum
Kunal Choudhary Is the President of Madhya Pradesh Youth Congress. In 2012, Madhya Pradesh Youth Congress president submitted a memorandum to the Governor of Madhya Pradesh demanding dismissal of the State Government run by Bharatiya Janata Party (BJP) for not able to protect teenager girls and murders.

Karnataka drought failure
In 2012, Youth Congress workers of Karnataka took out a procession in protest against the failure of the Government of Karnataka under BJP to tackle drought in 123 taluks and staged a mass protest in front of all taluk offices and locked the offices. A memorandum was submitted to Deputy Commissioner.

In January 2013, a 17 kilometer rally was held in Kannur demanding the dissolution of BJP government for 'failing' to provide good administration and losing the support of the majority.

India-Pakistan border protest for Indian soldiers
On 14 January 2013 more than hundred Youth Congress activists staged protests across India against Pakistan and its army outside the old customs gate at the Attari border over the killing of two Indian soldiers by Pakistani forces.

Implementation of 73rd and 74th Amendments in Jammu and Kashmir
In August, 2012 the Pradesh Youth Congress Jammu and Kashmir launched a statewide protest against the Government led by National Conference for the implementation of the 73rd and 74th Amendments to the Constitution of India relating to Panchayti Raj in Jammu and Kashmir. The protests were led by J&K youth Congress president Mohammad Shahnawaz Choudhary.

Kisaan Satyagrah against Land Acquisition Ordinance

In January 2015, Indian National Congress Vice President Rahul Gandhi directed nationwide protest against Land Acquisition Ordinance brought in by Indian Central government. The protest took place in various part of country. On 18 February, Indian Youth Congress protested against Vyapam Scam and Land Acquisition Ordinance near Madhya Pradesh Vidhan Sabha where they were charged with water canon in which several youth congress volunteers were hurt and arrested along with Indian Youth Congress National President Amrinder Singh Raja Warring.

Kerala Youth Congress Members Who Publicly Slaughtered A Calf
Days after  in Kerala publicly slaughtered a calf to protest against beef ban, Kerala Police on Thursday arrested eight people who were involved in the incident.

List of previous presidents

See also
 Indian National Congress
 National Students Union of India

References

External links
 
  

 
1960 establishments in India 
Youth wings of political parties in India